Sir Rashbehari Ghosh  (23 December 184528 February 1921) was an Indian politician, lawyer, social worker and philanthropist.

Early life
Rashbehari Ghosh was born on 23 December 1845 at Torkona village in Khandaghosh area in Purba Bardhaman district in Bengal Presidency. He attended Burdwan Raj Collegiate School and  Presidency College, Kolkata. He obtained a first class in the MA examination in English. In 1871, he passed with honours the Law examination and was awarded the degree of Doctor of Laws in 1884.

Political career
Ghosh became a member of the Indian National Congress and leaned towards the moderate wing. He had deep faith in progress but was opposed to radicalism in any form. He served as the President of the Congress for two terms. First in the historic 1907 Surat Session, succeeding Dadabhai Naoroji, after which the Congress split into Moderates and Extremists, and then the year after in  Madras, 1908.

Ghosh was a member of the Bengal Legislative Council (1891–94, 1906–9) and the Council of India. He was appointed a Companion of the Order of the Indian Empire (CIE) in the 1896 New Year Honours and appointed a Companion of the Order of the Star of India (CSI) in the 1909 Birthday Honours. He was knighted in the 1915 New Year Honours and conferred with his knighthood on 14 July of that year.

Contributions
Ghosh's ability and contributions earned him a series of honours, such as the Tagore Law Professorship (1875–76) at Calcutta University and an honorary DL degree from Calcutta University (1884).

He made a fortune through his legal practice, but donated much of it by way of charity and endowments. In 1913, he established an endowment for scientific studies at Calcutta University with an initial capital of ten lakh rupees. He also donated 13 lakh rupees to establish a National Council of Education (NCE) at Jadavpur. It later became Jadavpur University. Ghosh was the first president of NCE.

Keeping in line with his ideals Sir Rashbehari Ghosh Mahavidyalaya was established at Ukhrid in Khandaghosh CD Block in 2010. He also established schools and hospital in his village.

He also donated a princely sum (almost 33% of financial expenditure) to Acharya Praffulla Roy for establishing Bengal Chemical and Pharmaceutical Works.

Street named after Ghosh in Kolkata
Considering the contributions made by Ghosh for the people of India, a street was named after him in Kolkata. Rashbehari Avenue, named after him, starts from Chetla-Sahanagar Bridge (Shaheed Jatin Das Setu) and runs eastwards to Ballygunge and Gariahat.

References

Presidents of the Indian National Congress
Indian Knights Bachelor
Knights Bachelor
Companions of the Order of the Star of India
Companions of the Order of the Indian Empire
1845 births
1921 deaths
Indian social workers
Indian social reformers
Social workers from West Bengal
Indian educators
19th-century Indian educators
20th-century Indian educators
Educators from West Bengal
Bengali Hindus
Bengali lawyers
Indian lawyers
19th-century Indian lawyers
20th-century Indian lawyers
Indian philanthropists
West Bengal politicians